Brad Billsborough (4 August 1998) is a British rugby league footballer who plays as a  for the North Wales Crusaders in Betfred League 1. He also represents Germany internationally.

He has previously played for Whitehaven and the Swinton Lions in the Betfred Championship after coming through the St Helens academy team, He had a spell in Australia in 2019 season winning the group 2 premiership with Grafton Ghost. Billsboroughs' junior clubs were Newton Storm & Thatto Heath Crusaders. 

He was selected to play for Germany in the 2021 World Cup qualifiers; he qualifies via his mother who was born in Germany.
In 2018, Billsborough became Germany’s youngest ever captain

References

External links

1998 births
Living people
English rugby league players
Germany national rugby league team captains
Germany national rugby league team players
North Wales Crusaders players
Rugby league halfbacks
Rugby league players from Wigan
Swinton Lions players
Whitehaven R.L.F.C. players